Dahira yunlongensis is a moth of the family Sphingidae. It is known from Yunnan in China.

References

Dahira
Moths described in 2000